P. boneti may refer to

 Pseudocellus boneti, an arachnid in the family Ricinoididae, native to Mexico
 Pseudoeurycea boneti, a salamander in the family Plethodontidae, native to Mexico